Veeti Vainio (born 16 June 1997) is a Finnish professional ice hockey defenceman. He is currently playing with IF Björklöven in the Swedish HockeyAllsvenskan (Allsv). He was selected by the Columbus Blue Jackets in the fifth round, 141st overall, of the 2015 NHL Entry Draft.

Playing career
Vainio made his Liiga debut playing with Espoo Blues during the 2014–15 Liiga season.

Following two seasons under contract within the KooKoo organization, Vainio left as a free agent prior to the 2018–19 season and agreed to continue in the Liiga by signing an optional two-year contract with SaiPa on May 3, 2018.

Career statistics

Regular season and playoffs

International

References

External links

1997 births
Living people
IF Björklöven players
Columbus Blue Jackets draft picks
Espoo Blues players
Finnish ice hockey defencemen
KeuPa HT players
Kiekko-Vantaa players
KooKoo players
Lahti Pelicans players
SaiPa players
Sportspeople from Espoo